Aliyu Atta  was a Nigerian Policeman and former Inspector General of Police. He was appointed in 1990 to succeed Muhammadu Gambo Jimeta and was succeeded by Ibrahim Coomassie in 1993.

References

Nigerian police officers
People from Adamawa State
Year of birth missing (living people)
Living people